Methcathinone  (α-methylamino-propiophenone or ephedrone) (sometimes called "cat" or "jeff" or "catnip" or "M-Kat" or "kat" or "intash" ) is a monoamine alkaloid and psychoactive stimulant, a substituted cathinone. It is used as a recreational drug due to its potent stimulant and euphoric effects and is considered to be addictive, with both physical and psychological withdrawal occurring if its use is discontinued after prolonged or high-dosage administration. It is usually snorted, but can be smoked, injected, or taken orally.

Methcathinone is listed as a Schedule I controlled substance by the Convention on Psychotropic Substances and the United States' Controlled Substances Act, and as such it is not considered to be safe or effective in the treatment, diagnosis, prevention, or cure of any disease, and has no approved medical use. Possession and distribution of methcathinone for the purpose of human consumption is illegal under any/all circumstances in the United States and is either illegal or highly regulated in most jurisdictions worldwide.

History
Methcathinone was first synthesized in 1928 in the United States and was patented by Parke-Davis in 1957. It was used in the Soviet Union during the 1930s and 1940s as an anti-depressant (under the name Эфедрон—ephedrone). Methcathinone has long been used as a drug of abuse in the Soviet Union and Russia.

Circa 1994, the United States government recommended to the UN Secretary-General that methcathinone should be listed as a Schedule I controlled substance in the Convention on Psychotropic Substances. In 1995, following US advice, China added the drug to its list of prohibited substances and discontinued its pharmaceutical use.

Chemistry

Methcathinone is a beta-keto N-methylamphetamine and is closely related to the naturally occurring compounds, cathinone and cathine. It is also very closely related to methamphetamine, differing by only the β-ketone substituent and differing from amphetamine by both a keto and N-methyl substituent. Its carbon skeleton is identical to pseudoephedrine and methamphetamine. It differs from pseudoephedrine in that the hydroxide beta to the aromatic ring is oxidized to a ketone.

Methcathinone possesses a chiral carbon atom, and therefore two enantiomers are possible. When it is made semi-synthetically  from pseudo/ephedrine as a starting material, then only a single enantiomer is produced. Given that the chiral center has an alpha hydrogen and adjacent the carbonyl group, the molecule will racemize in solution via an enol intermediate. This process is known as keto–enol tautomerism.

Methcathinone production utilizes the oxidation of pseudoephedrine or ephedrine, the former being preferred because of much higher yields achieved. Oxidation of pseudoephedrine to methcathinone requires little chemistry experience, making it (relatively) easy to synthesize. Potassium permanganate (KMnO4) is most commonly used as the oxidant.

In clandestine laboratories, synthesizing methcathinone using potassium permanganate is considered undesirable because of the low yields and the high toxicity of this oxidant, however, if done in a proper laboratory using the proper procedures potassium permanganate can be a high-yielding reactant. A method that yields more methcathinone is oxidizing (pseudo)ephedrine with chromium (VI) compounds.

Methcathinone as free base is very unstable; it easily loses its ketone group, which is substituted with a hydroxyl group, yielding pseudoephedrine, in the reverse of the typical synthesis reaction.  Structurally, this occurs when the C=O bond at the Rβ-position is converted into a C-OH bond. Additionally, a dimerization reaction has been observed in solutions of freebase methcathinone, which yields a biologically inactive compound.

Effects 

Methcathinone hydrochloride increases spontaneous rodent locomotor activity, potentiates the release of dopamine from dopaminergic nerve terminals in the brain, and causes appetite suppression.  Users can easily forget to consume fluids leading to increased thirst and dehydration. The effects of methcathinone are similar to those of methamphetamine, initially deemed to be less intense by the inexperienced user, and often more euphoric.  The effects have been compared to those of cocaine, since it commonly causes hypertension (elevated blood pressure) and tachycardia (elevated heart rate).

Reported effects include:

 Feelings of euphoria
 Increased alertness
 Slurred speech
 Shaking of the limbs
 Increased heart rate
 Increased blood pressure, risk of stroke or heart attack
 Increased empathy and sense of communication
 Both decreased and increased sexual function and desire
 Bruxism
The effects of methcathinone usually last from four to six hours.

Pharmacology
Methcathinone has very strong affinities for the dopamine transporter and the norepinephrine (noradrenaline) transporter. Its affinity for the serotonin transporter is less than that of methamphetamine.

The C=O bond at the Rβ-position (directly right of the phenyl ring) is slightly polar, and as a result the drug does not cross the lipid blood–brain barrier quite as well as amphetamine. Nevertheless, it is a potent central nervous system (CNS) stimulant and dopamine reuptake inhibitor. Chronic high dosage use may result in acute mental confusion ranging from mild paranoia to psychosis. These symptoms typically disappear quickly if use is stopped.

Anecdotal reports have provided some information on patterns of methcathinone use. The most common route of administration is via nasal insufflation (snorting). Other routes of administration include per os, IV injection and smoking.

Illicit usage
Methcathinone binges resemble amphetamine binges in that the user may not sleep or eat, and takes in little in the way of liquids. The methcathinone binge is followed by long periods of sleep, excess eating, long-lasting nosebleeds (insufflation of methcathinone is corrosive to the nasal mucosa in the same manner as methamphetamine) and, in some cases, depression.

Addiction
In preclinical studies, methcathinone hydrochloride produces an abuse potential similar to that of the amphetamines.

Methcathinone can be highly psychologically addictive, and can produce a methamphetamine-like withdrawal, which is somewhat lower in intensity than methamphetamine.

In drug discrimination studies, methcathinone hydrochloride evokes responses similar to those induced by both dextroamphetamine sulfate and cocaine hydrochloride. While both the dextrorotary and levorotary enantiomeric forms of methcathinone hydrochloride have been found to be pharmacologically active when examined in particular pharmacological assays for psychomotor stimulant-like activity, the levorotary form of methcathinone is more active than the dextrorotary forms of both methcathinone and notable, as it is the dextrorotary isomer that is more active both for amphetamine and methamphetamine.

Some street dealers are selling methcathinone as dextroamphetamine or methamphetamine but the drug is more dangerous to people who inject it than the more common amphetamine.

Intravenous usage
Injecting this substance has recently been associated with symptoms similar to those seen in patients with Parkinson's disease (manganism) due to the compound manganese dioxide which is a byproduct of synthesis with permanganate.

Legal status
The Convention on Psychotropic Substances lists methcathinone as a Schedule I substance which restricts its use for government-approved medical and scientific uses.

Australia 
Methcathinone is a Schedule 9 prohibited substance in Australia under the Poisons Standard (February 2021). A Schedule 9 substance is defined as a substance which may be abused or misused, the manufacture, possession, sale or use of which should be prohibited by law except when required for medical or scientific research, or for analytical, teaching or training purposes with approval of Commonwealth and/or State or Territory Health Authorities.

United Kingdom 
In the United Kingdom, methcathinone is listed as a Class B drug with no clinical uses.

United States 
In the United States, methcathinone is listed as a Schedule I drug, for which there is no clinical use.

Netherlands
In the Netherlands, methcathinone is listed as a Level I substance of the Opium Law, for which there is no clinical use.

See also 
 Substituted cathinone

References

External links
 Cathinone & Methcathinone from Erowid
 International Drug Scheduling; Convention on Psychotropic Substances; Certain Stimulant/Hallucinogenic Drugs and Certain Nonbarbiturate Sedative Drugs, Food and Drug Administration, June 20, 1994.
 Methcathinone from lycaeum

Cathinones
Euphoriants
Norepinephrine-dopamine releasing agents
Stimulants
Substituted amphetamines